Events in the year 1893 in music.

Specific locations
1893 in Norwegian music

Events
 February 9 – Première of Giuseppe Verdi's final opera Falstaff in La Scala in Milan with Victor Maurel in the title rôle.
 Summer – Gustav Mahler's first summer composing at his Komponierhäuschen ("composition hut") at Steinbach am Attersee in the Salzkammergut region of Austria.
 August 14–15 – America's oldest music organization, the Stoughton Musical Society performs at the World's Columbian Exposition.
 October 16–28 – In Saint Petersburg (Russia), Pyotr Ilyich Tchaikovsky conducts the first performance of his Symphony No. 6 in B minor, Op. 74, Pathétique (Патетическая), nine days before his death (attributed to cholera). The second performance takes place 21 days later at a memorial concert conducted by Eduard Nápravník, incorporating minor revisions. Tchaikovsky wrote it between February and the end of August at Klin.
 December 16 – Antonín Dvořák's Symphony No. 9 "From the New World" receives its première at Carnegie Hall in New York City.
 December 29 – Claude Debussy's String Quartet is premièred in Paris.
 American sisters Patty and Mildred J. Hill publish Song Stories for the Kindergarten including "Good Morning to All", which later becomes known as "Happy Birthday to You".

Published popular music

Selected compositions (words/music indicated by "w.m."):
 "Can't Lose Me, Charlie" w.m. Harry S. Miller
 "The Cat Came Back"     w.m. Harry S. Miller
 "December And May"     w. Edward Marks m. William Lorraine
 "Do Do My Huckleberry Do"     w. Harry Dillon m. John Dillon (the Dillon Brothers)
 "The Fatal Wedding"     w. W. H. Windom m. Gussie L. Davis
 "Good Morning to All"     w. Patty Smith Hill m. Mildred J. Hill
 "I Long to See The Girl I Left Behind"     w.m. John T. Kelly
 "The Liberty Bell" by John Philip Sousa
 "Mamie, Come Kiss Your Honey"     w.m. May Irwin
 "Marguerite" by Charles A. White
 "Oh! Mr Porter"     w. Thomas Le Brunn m. George Le Brunn
 "Private Tommy Atkins"     w. Henry Hamilton m. S. Potter
 "Say 'Au Revoir', But Not 'Good-Bye'" by Harry Kennedy
 "Sweet Marie"     w. Cy Warman m. Raymond Moore
 "They All Take After Me"     w. T. W. Connor m. Harry Randall
 "Two Little Girls in Blue"     w.m. Charles Graham
 "The Volunteer Organist"     w. William G. Gray m. Henry Lamb
 "When The Roll Is Called Up Yonder"     w.m. James M. Black
 "Zacatecas" by Genaro Codina

Recorded popular music
"After the Ball (song)" – George J. Gaskin
"After the Fair (Parody)" – George H. Diamond
"Blind Tom" – Brilliant Quartette
"The Cat Came Back" – George H. Diamond
"Chinese Picnic" – Vess Ossman
"Cocoanut Dance" – Vess Ossman
"The Commodore Song" – Edward M. Favor
"Daisy Bell" – Dan W. Quinn
"Darkie Tickle" – Vess Ossman
"Down On The Farm" – Edward Clarance
"High School Cadets" – Vess Ossman
"The King's Song" – Edward M. Favor
"Love's Sweet Honor" – Vess Ossman
"Lovely Woman" – Al Reeves
"The Man That Broke the Bank at Monte Carlo” – George H. Diamond
"Marriage Bells" – Vess Ossman
"O Promise Me" – George J. Gaskin
"Parody On "After the Ball" – George H. Diamond
"Pat Brady and the World Fair at Chicago" – Dan Kelly
"The Washington Post (march)" – Vess Ossman
"When Summer Comes Again" – George H. Diamond
"Why Should I Keep From Whistling?" – John York AtLee & Fred Gaisberg

Classical music
Amy Beach – Gaelic Symphony
Johannes Brahms
Six Pieces for Piano, Op. 118
Four Pieces for Piano, Op. 119
Claude Debussy – String Quartet in G minor
Antonín Dvořák – Symphony no. 9 in E minor, "From the New World"
Edward German – Symphony in A minor, "Norwich"
Johan Halvorsen – Entry of the Boyars
Sergei Rachmaninoff 
 Fantaisie-Tableaux, for two pianos, Op. 5
 Morceaux de salon for violin and piano, Op. 6
Jean Sibelius – Lemminkäinen Suite
William Stanley – Bay View Gavotte in A major
Josef Suk – Quintet for Piano and Strings in G minor
Pyotr Ilyich Tchaikovsky – Symphony no. 6 in B minor, "Pathétique"

Opera
Granville Bantock – Caedmar
Julius Bechgaard – Frode premiered on May 11 in Copenhagen
Engelbert Humperdinck – Hänsel und Gretel
Isidore de Lara – Amy Robsart
Emile Pessard
Une nuit de Noël premiered at the Ambigu, Paris
Mam'zelle Carabin premiered on November 3 at the Théâtre des Bouffes Parisiens, Salle Choiseul, Paris
Giacomo Puccini – Manon Lescaut
Camille Saint-Saëns – Phryné
Giuseppe Verdi – Falstaff

Musical theater
 A Gaiety Girl – London production opened at the Prince of Wales Theatre on October 14 and ran for 413 performances
 Jane Annie – London production opened at the Savoy Theatre on May 13 and ran for 50 performances
 Little Christopher Columbus – London production opened at the Lyric Theatre on October 10 and ran for 279 performances
 Morocco Bound (music Frank Osmond Carr lyrics: Adrian Ross) – London production opened at the Shaftesbury Theatre on April 13 and transferred to the Trafalgar Square Theatre on January 8, 1894, for a total run of 295 performances.
 A Trip To Chinatown – Broadway production
 Utopia Limited – London production opened at the Savoy Theatre on October 7 and ran for 245 performances

Births
February 10 – Jimmy Durante, American comedian and singer (died 1980)
February 15 – Walter Donaldson, American songwriter (died 1947)
February 21 – Andrés Segovia, Spanish classical guitarist (died 1987)
April 2 – Sergei Protopopov, Russian composer and music theorist (died 1954)
April 16 – Federico Mompou, Spanish classical composer (died 1987)
June 26 –  Big Bill Broonzy, American blues singer, songwriter and guitarist (died 1958)
June 28 – Luciano Gallet, Brazilian composer, pianist and conductor (died 1931)
July 3 – Mississippi John Hurt, American country blues singer and guitarist (died 1966)
July 28 – Rued Langgaard, Danish composer and organist (died 1952)
August 21 – Lili Boulanger, French composer (died 1918)
August 22 – Dorothy Parker, American writer, poet and lyricist (died 1953)
September 13 – Larry Shields, American Dixieland jazz clarinetist (died 1953)
September 24 – Blind Lemon Jefferson, blues musician (died 1929)
October 1 – Cliff Friend, American Tin Pan Alley songwriter (died 1974)
October 23 – Jean Absil, Belgian composer and organist (died 1974)
November 8 – Clarence Williams, American jazz pianist, composer, promoter, vocalist, theatrical producer and publisher (died 1965)
December 7 — Fay Bainter, American actress (d. 1968)
December 24 – Harry Warren, born Salvatore Antonio Guaragna, American film songwriter (died 1981)

Deaths
January 18 – Julius Eichberg, composer (b. 1824)
February 13 – George Lichtenstein, pianist and music teacher (b. 1827)
May 2 – , composer (b.1809)
May 25 – Johann Rufinatscha, composer and music teacher (b. 1812)
June 10 –  Elek Erkel, Hungarian composer, son of Ferenc Erkel (b. 1843)
June 25 – Ferenc Erkel, Hungarian composer (b. 1810)
July 16 – Antonio Ghislanzoni, librettist (b. 1824)
August 7 – Alfredo Catalani, composer (b. 1854)
August 31 – Sir William Cusins, instrumentalist, conductor and composer; Master of the Queen's Music (b. 1833)
September 8 – Michel Lentz, lyricist of the national anthem of Luxembourg (b. 1820)
September 13 – Carl Ludvig Gerlach, opera singer and composer
October 16 – Carlo Pedrotti, conductor and composer (b. 1817)
October 18 – Charles Gounod, composer (b. 1818)
November 6 – Pyotr Ilyich Tchaikovsky, composer (b. 1840)
December 23 – Benedict Randhartinger, composer (b. 1802)
date unknown – Félix Battanchon, cellist (b. 1814)

References

External links

 
1890s in music
19th century in music
Music by year